Polygonibacillus  is a genus of bacteria from the family of Bacillaceae with one known species (Polygonibacillus indicireducens).

References

Bacillaceae
Bacteria genera
Monotypic bacteria genera